Bel Air is a census-designated place (CDP) located in Allegany County, Maryland, United States. As of the 2010 census it had a population of 1,258. It is surrounded by the Cresaptown CDP and prior to 2010 was listed by the Census Bureau as part of the Cresaptown-Bel Air CDP.  Bel Air is part of the Cumberland, MD-WV Metropolitan Statistical Area.

Demographics

References

Census-designated places in Maryland
Census-designated places in Allegany County, Maryland
Populated places in the Cumberland, MD-WV MSA